John Lawlor Jolley (July 14, 1840December 14, 1926) was a member of the United States House of Representatives from South Dakota.

Biography
He was born in Montreal, Upper Canada (now Quebec) in 1840, where he attended the common schools. He graduated from Eastman Business College in Poughkeepsie, New York. He moved to Wisconsin in 1857, and enlisted as a private in Company C, Twenty-third Regiment, of the Wisconsin Volunteer Infantry. He was mustered out as a second lieutenant on July 4, 1865.

He took up the study of the law and was admitted to the bar in 1866. Vermillion of the Dakota Territory.is where he first established his practice. He was a member of the territorial council in 1875 and 1881. In 1887 and 1895, he was elected mayor of Vermillion. He was a delegate to the Republican National Convention in 1884.

In 1889, he was a delegate to the state constitutional convention. He was also selected for the South Dakota State Senate in 1889. In 1891 he was elected to Seat B, one of South Dakota's two at-large seats in the United States House of Representatives, filling the vacancy caused by the death of John Rankin Gamble. He chose not to seek a full term, and resumed the practice of law. He died in Vermillion in 1926, and was buried at Vermillion's Bluff View Cemetery.

Jolley Elementary School, in Vermillion, SD, is named after Mr. Jolley.

External links 

1840 births
1926 deaths
People of Wisconsin in the American Civil War
Politicians from Montreal
Members of the Dakota Territorial Legislature
19th-century American politicians
Mayors of places in South Dakota
South Dakota state senators
South Dakota lawyers
Republican Party members of the United States House of Representatives from South Dakota
People from Vermillion, South Dakota
19th-century American lawyers